Roy Wilson McNeal (June 23, 1891 – May 25, 1976) was an American college sports coach, athletics administrator, and professor. He served as the head football coach at Albany College—now known as Lewis & Clark College—in Albany, Oregon from 1920 to 1921, the College of Puget Sound—now known as the University of Puget Sound—in Tacoma, Washington from 1922 to 1925, and Southern Oregon State Normal School—now known as Southern Oregon University—in Ashland, Oregon from 1927 to 1931. He also coached basketball, baseball, and track at Albany. McNeal later served as professor of geography at Southern Oregon.

McNeal attended Henderson-Brown College—now known as Henderson State University—in Arkadelphia, Arkansas, where he earned eight varsity letters in two years. He played at tackle and fullback in football, and ran the 440-yard dash in track. McNeal earned a Bachelor of Science degree from the University of Arizona in 1916. At Arizona, he was an assistant to coach Pop McKale.

Head coaching record

Football

References

1891 births
1976 deaths
American football fullbacks
American football tackles
American male sprinters
Henderson State Reddies football players
Lewis & Clark Pioneers athletic directors
Lewis & Clark Pioneers baseball coaches
Lewis & Clark Pioneers football coaches
Lewis & Clark Pioneers men's basketball coaches
Puget Sound Loggers athletic directors
Puget Sound Loggers football coaches
Southern Oregon Raiders athletic directors
Southern Oregon Raiders football coaches
Southern Oregon Raiders men's basketball coaches
Southern Oregon University faculty
College men's track and field athletes in the United States
College track and field coaches in the United States
University of Arizona alumni
People from Dallas County, Missouri